The Complexe Al Amal is a tennis complex in Casablanca, Morocco. The complex is the host of the annual ATP Tour stop, the Grand Prix Hassan II.  The stadium court has a capacity of 5,500 people.

See also
 List of tennis stadiums by capacity

External links 
 Davis Cup Morocco vs Great Britain september 2003

Tennis venues in Morocco
Sports venues in Casablanca

fr:Grand-Prix Hassan II#Le complexe Al Amal